François Anne David (1741-1824), was a French line-engraver.

David was born in Paris in 1741, where he lived and worked all his life. He was a pupil of Le Bas, and engraved several portraits and other subjects in a neat, finished style. He died in Paris in 1824.

Portraits
Louis Stanislas Xavier, Monsieur, afterwards Louis XVIII; after Drouais.
Louis XVIII; full-length, in his robes; after himself.
Denis Diderot; after L. M. van Loo.
César Gabriel de Choiseul, Duc de Praslin; after Roslin.
Catharine II, Empress of Russia; after Mlle. Durameau.
Gaspard Netscher, painter, his Wife and Son; after Netscher.
Charles I of England with his Family; after Van Dyck.

Subjects after various masters
Adam and Eve in Paradise; after Santerre.
Christ crowned with thorns; after Titian.
St. Cecilia; after Raphael.
The Dutch Sportsman; after G. Metsu.
The Green-Market at Amsterdam; after the same.
The Quack Doctor; after Karel Du Jardin.
The Bull; after Paul Potter.
Two Views of the Gulf of Venice; after Joseph Vernet.
Two Views near Dunkirk; after the same.

References

Further reading
 
 
 
 
 
 
 
 

1741 births
1824 deaths
18th-century engravers
19th-century engravers
French engravers
Artists from Paris